Telostylus is a genus of flies in the family Neriidae.

Species
Telostylus babiensis Meijere, 1916
Telostylus binotatus Bigot, 1859
Telostylus decemnotatus Hendel, 1913
Telostylus inversus Hennig, 1937
Telostylus latibrachium Enderlein, 1922
Telostylus maccus Osten Sacken, 1882
Telostylus marshalli Sepúlveda & Carvalho, 2019
Telostylus niger Bezzi, 1914
Telostylus philippinensis Cresson, 1926
Telostylus remipes (Walker, 1860)
Telostylus trilineatus Meijere, 1910
Telostylus whitmorei Sepúlveda & Carvalho, 2019

References

Brachycera genera
Neriidae
Taxa named by Jacques-Marie-Frangile Bigot
Diptera of Asia